This incomplete list of works by Guido Cagnacci contains paintings and drawings in a variety of genres. Titles and dates often vary by source.

List of works by year

Notes

References

Further reading 

 Pasini, Pier Giorgio (1986). Guido Cagnacci: pittore (1601–1663): catalogo generale. Rimini: Luisè. [Italian]
 Salomon, Xavier F. (2016). The Art of Guido Cagnacci. New York: The Frick Collection. [English]

Lists of works of art
Paintings by Guido Cagnacci